"Naachne Ka Shaunq" is a desi hip hop song by Indian rapper Raftaar featuring Brodha V, released by Zee Music Company on 11 February 2019. It is the 12th track from Raftaar's album, "Mr. Nair".

Background 
The song is about the current situation in Indian hip hop. People only listen and mindlessly dance to the beat, not understanding the meaning of the song and the lyrics. Raftaar also takes shots at the pop music genre, in an attempt to show the Indian public that they only listen to songs which are party numbers. They do not support good rap artists.

The song heavily samples American comedian and rapper, Big Shaq's 2017 hit single Man's Not Hot. Raftaar references the song by rapping, "The thing goes skrrrahh...", a line used in Shaq's song. There are also disses targeted at American rapper Lil Pump. Raftaar mentions the song Gucci Gang in the starting as well as in the last part, telling the audience to stop listening to such music.

Brodha V also raps about the music industry. He speaks about the language barrier in India, saying that he would be more successful in his career if the industry was not so Hindi-dominated. He raps about the condition of songs that tell the truth, and about his experiences in the music industry.

Reception 

The song's music video received 5 million views on YouTube in one day. It is one of the most viewed Indian hip hop songs on YouTube, currently having 48 million views (as of 17 August 2022).

References

External links 

 Naachne Ka Shaunq on iTunes
 Naachne Ka Shaunq on Gaana
 Naachne Ka Shaunq on JioSaavn
 Naachne Ka Shaunq on Spotify
 Naachne Ka Shaunq on Hungama

Raftaar (rapper) songs
2019 singles